Euphaedra splendens, the splendid Themis forester, is a butterfly in the family Nymphalidae. It is found in Ghana, Nigeria, Cameroon, Equatorial Guinea and the Republic of the Congo. The habitat consists of wetter forests.

Subspecies
Euphaedra splendens splendens (Nigeria, Cameroon, Bioko, northern Congo)
Euphaedra splendens ghanaensis Hecq & Joly, 2004 (Ghana)

References

Butterflies described in 1982
splendens